Sebastjan Cimirotič (born 14 September 1974) is a retired Slovenian football player.

He played for the Slovenia national football team and was a participant at the 2002 FIFA World Cup, scoring the nation's first ever World Cup goal.

International career
Cimirotič debuted for Slovenia on 25 March 1998 against Poland. He represented Slovenia at the 2002 FIFA World Cup, scoring in their 3–1 defeat to Spain in Gwangju.

Career statistics

International 
Scores and results list Slovenia's goal tally first, score column indicates score after each Cimirotič goal.

See also
Slovenian international players

References

External links

1974 births
Living people
Footballers from Ljubljana
Slovenian footballers
Association football forwards
NK Olimpija Ljubljana (1945–2005) players
HNK Rijeka players
Hapoel Tel Aviv F.C. players
U.S. Lecce players
NK Celje players
Incheon United FC players
HNK Hajduk Split players
NK Domžale players
NK Olimpija Ljubljana (2005) players
Slovenian PrvaLiga players
Croatian Football League players
Israeli Premier League players
Serie A players
Serie B players
K League 1 players
Slovenian Second League players
Slovenian expatriate footballers
Expatriate footballers in Croatia
Expatriate footballers in Israel
Expatriate footballers in Italy
Expatriate footballers in South Korea
Expatriate footballers in Austria
Slovenian expatriate sportspeople in Croatia
Slovenian expatriate sportspeople in Israel
Slovenian expatriate sportspeople in Italy
Slovenian expatriate sportspeople in South Korea
Slovenian expatriate sportspeople in Austria
2002 FIFA World Cup players
Slovenia under-21 international footballers
Slovenia international footballers